This is a list of the tallest mountains in the Solar System. This list includes peaks on all celestial bodies where significant mountains have been detected. For some celestial bodies, different peaks are given across different types of measurement. The solar system's tallest mountain is possibly the central peak of Rheasilvia on the asteroid Vesta, estimated at up to 25 km from peak to base, though it's lowest estimate is only 20 km tall. Among the terrestrial planets the tallest mountain is Olympus Mons on Mars, at 21.9 km, which would also make it the tallest overall if Rheasilvia's lowest estimate turns out to be more accurate.



List
Heights are given from base to peak (although a precise definition for mean base level is lacking). Peak elevations above sea level are only available on Earth, and possibly Titan. On other worlds, peak elevations above an equipotential surface or a reference ellipsoid could be used if enough data is available for the calculation, but this is often not the case.

Tallest mountains by elevation

 Olympus Mons 
 Equatorial Ridge 
 Boösaule Mons 
 Ascraeus Mons 
 Ionian Mons 
 Elysium Mons 
 Arsia Mons 
 Limb Mountain 
 Skadi Mons 
 Euboea Montes 
 Mount Everest  
 Teide 
 Herschel Peak 
 Anseris Mons 
 Tenzing Montes 
 Denali 
 Mount Kilimanjaro 
 Mons Huygens 
 Aeolis Mons 
 Piccard Mons 
 Maat Mons 
 Wright Mons 
 Mons Hadley  
 Butler Mons 
 Mauna Kea 
 Ahuna Mons 
 Dorothy Peak 
 Mithrim Montes 
 Haleakala 
 Caloris Montes 
 Io (unnamed peak) 
 Janiculum Dorsa 
 Doom Mons 
 Mons Rümker

Gallery
The following images are shown in order of decreasing base-to-peak height.

See also

List of extraterrestrial volcanoes
List of highest mountains on Earth
List of Solar System extremes
List of largest craters in the Solar System
List of largest lakes and seas in the Solar System
List of largest rifts, canyons and valleys in the Solar System
List of mountains on Mars by height
Mons (planetary nomenclature)
Topographic prominence

Notes

References

External links

 3-D anaglyphs of Rheasilvia's central peak at photojournal.jpl.nasa.gov: top view and side view
 Color views of Rheasilvia's central peak at Planetary.org: side view (peak is at upper right) and mosaic of Vesta's southern hemisphere
 Color panorama of Aeolis Mons from 21 September 2012 (smaller color-balanced view here)
 Color view of Aeolis Mons by Seán Doran
 High resolution video of overflight of lower slopes of Aeolis Mons by Seán Doran
 Gigapixel panorama of the Mount Everest area by David Breashears

Tallest
Solar System
Mountains, tallest in the Solar System
Solar System
Solar System
Mountains
Mountains in the Solar System